Miroslav Mosnár (born 10 August 1968) is a Slovak ice hockey player and coach.

Mosnár represented  in the men's ice hockey tournament at the 1998 Winter Olympics.

Career statistics

Regular season and playoffs

International

References

External links
 
 

1968 births
Living people
Olympic ice hockey players of Slovakia
Ice hockey players at the 1998 Winter Olympics
Ice hockey people from Bratislava
HC Slovan Bratislava players
HC Dynamo Pardubice players
Czechoslovak ice hockey defencemen
Slovak ice hockey defencemen
Slovak ice hockey coaches
Expatriate ice hockey players in Austria
Expatriate ice hockey players in Italy
Expatriate ice hockey players in England
Expatriate ice hockey players in France
Slovak expatriate ice hockey players in the Czech Republic
Slovak expatriate sportspeople in Italy
Slovak expatriate sportspeople in France
Slovak expatriate sportspeople in England